General Thomas Bruce (1738 – 12 December 1797), was a British soldier and politician, the third son of William Bruce, 8th Earl of Kincardine.

He was educated at Rugby School and joined the Army, serving in India during the War of American Independence and rising to the rank of Lieut-General in 1796. He commanded the British forces in the West Indies, leading the unsuccessful attack against Martinique in June 1793. He was made Colonel of the 16th (Buckinghamshire) Regiment of Foot in 1788, a position he held until his death.

He was the Member of Parliament for Marlborough, 22 June 1790 – 30 May 1796, and Great Bedwyn, 28 May 1796 – 12 December 1797.

He died unmarried in 1797
.

References

1738 births
1797 deaths
Younger sons of earls
People educated at Rugby School
British Army generals
Members of the Parliament of Great Britain for English constituencies
British MPs 1790–1796
British MPs 1796–1800